San Wai, also called Kun Lung Wai, is a walled village in Lung Yeuk Tau, Fanling, Hong Kong. It is one of the Five Wai (walled villages) and Six Tsuen (villages) in Lung Yeuk Tau.

Administration
San Wai is one of the villages represented within the Fanling District Rural Committee. For electoral purposes, San Wai is part of the Queen's Hill constituency, which is currently represented by Law Ting-tak.

San Wai, as part of Lung Yeuk Tau, is a recognized village under the New Territories Small House Policy.

Conservation
San Wai is located along the Lung Yeuk Tau Heritage Trail. The gate tower of San Wai is a declared monument since 1988, while the enclosing walls and watch towers are declared monuments since 1993.

See also
 Walled villages of Hong Kong

References

External links

 Delineation of area of existing village Lung Yeuk Tau (Fanling) for election of resident representative (2019 to 2022) (includes San Wai)
 Antiquities and Monuments Office. Hong Kong Traditional Chinese Architectural Information System. Kun Lung Wai

Walled villages of Hong Kong
Declared monuments of Hong Kong
Lung Yeuk Tau
Villages in North District, Hong Kong